Monoleptophaga is a genus of parasitic flies in the family Tachinidae.

Species
Monoleptophaga caldwelli Baranov, 1938

Distribution
Australia.

References

Exoristinae
Tachinidae genera
Monotypic Brachycera genera
Diptera of Australasia
Taxa named by Nikolay Ilyich Baranov